Platycerium hillii is a species of staghorn fern in the genus Platycerium. It is found in Australia.

References

 Gard. Chron. ser. 2, 10:429. 1878.

External links
 The Plant List entry
 Encyclopedia of Life entry
 

hillii